The 1986 European Wrestling Championships  was held from 14 to 20 April 1986 in Piraeus, Greece.

Medal table

Medal summary

Men's freestyle

Men's Greco-Roman

References

External links
Fila's official championship website

Europe
W
European Wrestling Championships
Euro
Sports competitions in Piraeus
1986 in European sport